Ahmed Ali Kohzad is a prominent Hazara Politician in Quetta Pakistan and General Secretary of Hazara Democratic Party. He has been elected as member of Provincial Assembly of Balochistan from PB-26 (Quetta-III) in 2018 Pakistani general election. He completed his political science degree from Balochistan University and since then he has been active in politics and a member of Hazara Student Federation.

He is now been directed by Balochistan High Court to approach MOI to clear his Nationality on 07-08-2018

References

Hazara Democratic Party politicians
Pakistani people of Hazara descent
Politicians from Quetta
1979 births
Living people